Dale Noelle is an American model, educator, health coach, philanthropist, entrepreneur, and the founder and CEO of TRUE Model Management.

Early life and modeling career 
Dale Noelle's interest in fashion began in childhood while spending time at her father's clothing factories. She later attended California State Polytechnic University and University of South Florida, earning a business degree. She worked as a clothing production manager, as well as a sales representative, designer, and owner of a fashion clothing license before becoming a fitting model.

During her 20-year career as a professional model, Noelle worked for fashion brands and designers including Oscar de la Renta, Oleg Cassini, Michael Kors, Calvin Klein, Ralph Lauren, Donna Karan, Tommy Hilfiger, and Nicole Miller.
 
Noelle worked directly with the late Oleg Cassini to fit his final collection for David's Bridal, did fitting in Europe and Asia with Michael Kors, worked with Tommy Hilfiger and his financiers Lawrence Stroll and Silas Chou in Hong Kong for Tommy Hilfiger's first women's collection, and was Calvin Klein and Oscar de la Renta's fit model for many years.

After her career with Ford Models, Inc., Noelle began to manage her own modeling career in 2008. In December 2011 she started a full-service management company TRUE Model Management to represent fit, show, and print models worldwide.

Philanthropy
Noelle is a member of The President's Circle for Fred Hutchinson, a group of donors providing funding towards cancer research and solutions.

Noelle has served as an Honorary Committee member or host for various charities and event fundraisers including Women's Entrepreneurship Day at the United Nations, the Women Helping Women New York Luncheon, K.I.D.S. Fashion Delivers, and H.O.P.E. Foundation.

Noelle launched TRUECares, which will be the philanthropic arm of the company. TRUECares models donate a percentage of their earnings through TRUE to numerous organizations, and TRUE Model Management will match the donation percentage of each model.

Personal life
Noelle's primary residence is in New York City, although she travels frequently and lives part-time in California.

Media recognition
Noelle has been featured in multiple television, print, and online publications, including Bloomberg, Forbes, Fox Business News, The Huffington Post, New York Times
, New York Daily News, New York Post, ABC News, "News 8" on WJLA-TV, "You & Me This Morning" on WCIU-TV, "San Antonio Living" on WOAI-TV, and "Let's Talk Live" on WTNH-TV.

Other projects
Noelle is an instructor at Fashion Institute of Technology - State University of New York (FIT), a board member of the Women and Fashion Filmfest, and creator of the organization's Girls' Empowerment Fashion Runway show. She also works with New York organizations to bring more clothing manufacturing to America.

Noelle was a panelist in the discussion with filmmaker James Belzer and Dennita Sewell, curator of fashion design at Phoenix Art Museum, at the 16th Annual Fashion Conference hosted by IAC (Initiatives in Art & Culture) at CUNY. Dale Noelle highlighted the significant drop in domestic production and jobs as well as the importance of Education to train American workers to gain skills needed to produce more USA-made products.

Noelle holds a certification in Health Coaching and is an advocate for positive body image. She has experience in teaching yoga/fitness training and supports the National Eating Disorder Association (NEDA).

Noelle was recently nominated as an emerging leader on the board of The Federal Enforcement Homeland Security Foundation. In addition, she serves as an advisor on the board of TedX Fulton Street.

References

Year of birth missing (living people)
Living people
American female models
American educators
Place of birth missing (living people)
21st-century American women